"Can't Stop Playing" is a song by electronic music producers Dr. Kucho! and Gregor Salto. Released in 2005, it reached the top 20 in the Netherlands. On 29 August 2014, a remix by Dutch producer Oliver Heldens and Gregor Salto was released through Spinnin' Records, and reached number one on Beatport's download chart shortly after its release. A vocal version of the remix featuring Norwegian singer Ane Brun was subsequently produced, titled "Can't Stop Playing (Makes Me High)", and it was released in the United Kingdom through Ministry of Sound on 12 April 2015, where it debuted and peaked at number four on the UK Singles Chart.

Track listings
2015 UK digital download
 "Can't Stop Playing (Makes Me High)" (Oliver Heldens Vocal Edit) (feat. Ane Brun) – 2:37

2015 UK digital download (remixes)
 "Can't Stop Playing" (Oliver Heldens & Gregor Salto Remix Edit) – 4:15
 "Can't Stop Playing (Makes Me High)" (Cyantific Remix) (feat. Ane Brun) – 3:51
 "Can't Stop Playing (Makes Me High)" (Joker Remix) (feat. Ane Brun) – 3:28
 "Can't Stop Playing (Makes Me High)" (Danny Howard Remix) (feat. Ane Brun) – 5:27
 "Can't Stop Playing" (Dr. Kucho! Remix) – 6:43
 "Can't Stop Playing (Makes Me High)" (Oliver Heldens Vocal Extended) (feat. Ane Brun) – 4:31

Charts and certifications

Original version

Weekly charts

Year-end charts

Oliver Heldens and Gregor Salto remix

Weekly charts

"Can't Stop Playing (Makes Me High)"

Weekly charts

Year-end charts

Certifications

Release history

References

2015 songs
2015 singles
2014 songs
2014 singles
2005 songs
2005 singles
Ministry of Sound singles
Spinnin' Records singles
Songs written by Gregor Salto